The Virtuoso may refer to:

The Virtuoso (play), a 1676 play by Thomas Shadwell
The Virtuoso (film), a 2021 film directed by Nick Stagliano

See also
Virtuoso (disambiguation)